Omid Homayoun is a Cypriot professional volleyball and beach volleyball player, currently playing for Nea Salaminas VC in Limassol Cyprus.

He has also been an active member of Cyprus Volleyball Federation (CVF) (Greek: Kυπριακή Oμοσπονδία Πετοσφαίρισης, Κ.Ο.ΠΕ)  since 2002 and his home club is Omonia V.C.

Athletic career

He has been an outstanding player for top volleyball clubs in Cyprus including Apoel Volleyball Club, as well as assistant coach for women teams, and university teams during his athletic career.

Omid is right handed and is an outside hitter. His early volleyball career started in Nicosia where he played for Omonia V.C. youth team in 2002. He then progressed to play with the main team in Cyprus main volleyball division. His international volleyball career is playing for two volleyball clubs in Athens Greece.

References

Cyprus Volleyball Federation
Omid Homayoun Playing at the Cyprus Volleyball Cup

1987 births
Living people
Cypriot men's volleyball players
APOEL V.C. players
Omonia V.C. players
Cypriot First Division players
Association footballers not categorized by position
Association football players not categorized by nationality